Steven J. Heine is a Canadian professor of psychology at the University of British Columbia, Department of Psychology. He specialises in cultural psychology and has been described as "a leading figure" in that field.

Professional background 
Heine's research specialty is social psychology, particularly cultural psychology with an emphasis on the differences between Western and East Asian culture. He also has done research on the meaning maintenance model and genetic essentialism.

Honors and awards 
In 2003, Heine was awarded the Distinguished Scientist Early Career Award for Social Psychology, American Psychological Association. In 2011, he was honored with the Career Trajectory Award, Society of Experimental Social Psychology. In 2016, he was elected as a fellow into the Royal Society of Canada.

Selected publications

Journal articles

References 

Living people
Canadian psychologists
Academic staff of the University of British Columbia
Year of birth missing (living people)
Cultural psychologists
Social psychologists
Fellows of the Royal Society of Canada